Alfredo Sampaio (born 23 May 1958) is a Brazilian professional football manager and former player. He is the current manager of Madureira.

Playing career
He served for 15 years as a defender. He began his career playing futsal. Then played football with the America Football Club in Rio de Janeiro, with his father, who was involved with the club. Yet passed by São Cristóvão and Bonsucesso.

Post-playing career
Always addressed small teams of Rio de Janeiro as São Cristóvão, Bangu, Portuguesa, America, Itaperuna, Entrerriense, Friburguense and Madureira. The Avaí acted in large part of the 2007 Campeonato Brasileiro Série B where his team placed 15th. In 2008, voltaou coach of Madureira, but left the club to be sought to be auxiliary of Romário, who to put an end to fulfil his contract with the Vasco da Gama, and as an assistant coach of Romario and then took over the command of the team.

In 2009, he returned to be coach of Madureira and Cabofriense. in the year 2010, took over the command of the Americano, but has been little time for the club, due to family issues. In 2011, took over the command of the Boavista, where the led up to the end of the bowl Taça Guanabara 2011. Months after he took the Duque de Caxias, for the dispute of Série B, where after negative results in the competition, he was dismissed on 23 June.

In season 2014 he drove two clubs being the first the Bonsucesso and the second the Cabofriense. Already in 2015 hit with the Resende. At the end of 2015, hit again with Madureira in season 2016.

Honours 
 Portuguesa da Ilha
 Campeonato Carioca Série B: 1996

 Madureira
 Taça Rio: 2006

References

External links
 Sambafoot profile 
 Net Vasco profile 

1958 births
Living people
Footballers from Rio de Janeiro (city)
Brazilian footballers
Brazilian football managers
Campeonato Brasileiro Série B managers
Campeonato Brasileiro Série C managers
Campeonato Brasileiro Série D managers
America Football Club (RJ) players
São Cristóvão de Futebol e Regatas players
Bonsucesso Futebol Clube players
São Cristóvão de Futebol e Regatas managers
Associação Atlética Portuguesa (RJ) managers
Bangu Atlético Clube managers
America Football Club (RJ) managers
Madureira Esporte Clube managers
Avaí FC managers
CR Vasco da Gama managers
Associação Desportiva Cabofriense managers
Americano Futebol Clube managers
Boavista Sport Club managers
Duque de Caxias Futebol Clube managers
Volta Redonda Futebol Clube managers
Bonsucesso Futebol Clube managers
Resende Futebol Clube managers
Association football defenders